The fictional animated singing group Alvin and the Chipmunks created by Ross Bagdasarian have appeared in eight feature-length films since their debut.

Films

Theatrical animated film

The Chipmunk Adventure (1987)

When David Seville goes off to Europe on a business trip, the Chipmunks, Alvin, Simon and Theodore, are left at home with their babysitter, Miss Beatrice Miller. While the three are playing an arcade game of Around the World in Thirty Days with the Chipettes, Alvin and Brittany argue over which would win an actual race around the world, since Brittany beat Alvin in the video game. Diamond smugglers Claudia and Klaus Furschtein overhear the conversation and approach the children, telling them that they will provide them with the means for a real race around the world by hot air balloon, with the winner receiving $100,000.

Theatrical live-action films

Alvin and the Chipmunks (2007)

In a tree farm, three musically inclined chipmunks, Alvin (Justin Long), the mischievous troublemaker, Simon (Matthew Gray Gubler), the smart one in the trio, and Theodore (Jesse McCartney) the chubby sweethearted chipmunk, find their tree cut down and are transported to Los Angeles. Once there, they meet frustrated songwriter David Seville (Jason Lee), and despite a poor house-wrecking first impression, they impress him with their singing talent. Seeing the opportunity for success, both human and chipmunks make a pact for them to sing his songs. While that ambition proves a frustrating struggle with the difficult trio, the dream does come true after all. However, that success presents its own trials as their unscrupulous record executive, Ian Hawke (David Cross), plans to break up this family to exploit the boys. Can Dave and the Chipmunks discover what they really value amid the superficial glamour around them?

Alvin and the Chipmunks: The Squeakquel (2009)

Pop sensations Alvin (Justin Long), Simon (Matthew Gray Gubler) and Theodore (Jesse McCartney) end up in the care of Dave Seville (Jason Lee)'s twenty-something cousin Toby (Zachary Levi). The boys must put aside music super stardom to return to school, and are tasked with saving the school's music program by winning the $25,000 prize in a battle of the bands. But the Chipmunks unexpectedly meet their match in three singing chipmunks known as The Chipettes—Brittany (Christina Applegate), Jeanette (Anna Faris) and Eleanor (Amy Poehler). Romantic and musical sparks are ignited when the Chipmunks and Chipettes square off.

Alvin and the Chipmunks: Chipwrecked (2011)

Dave (Jason Lee), the Chipmunks, and the Chipettes enjoy fun and mischief on a luxury cruise before their seafaring vacation takes an unexpected detour to an uncharted island. Now, the harder Alvin (Justin Long) and friends search for a way back to civilization, the more obvious it becomes that they aren't alone on this secluded island paradise.

Alvin and the Chipmunks: The Road Chip (2015)

Through a series of misunderstandings, Alvin (Justin Long), Simon (Matthew Gray Gubler) and Theodore (Jesse McCartney) come to believe that Dave (Jason Lee) is going to propose to his new girlfriend in Miami...and dump them. They have three days to get to him and stop the proposal, saving themselves not only from losing Dave but possibly from gaining a terrible stepbrother.

Direct-to-video films

Alvin and the Chipmunks Meet Frankenstein (1999)

When the Chipmunks take a break from their concert, they get lost, and eventually get locked inside the park. They find their way to the "Frankenstein's Castle" attraction, where a real Dr. Victor Frankenstein is working on his monster. The monster is brought to life, and the doctor sends it in pursuit of the Chipmunks. In their escape, the monster retrieves Theodore's dropped teddy bear. Now it's up to the Chipmunks to get back his teddy bear and do something to the monster.

Alvin and the Chipmunks Meet the Wolfman (2000)

When Alvin has nightmares of meeting the Wolfman, which led him waking up screaming in horror, Simon and Dave conclude that Alvin's been watching too many horror films at night. Alvin says that it is because their new neighbor, Lawrence Talbot, creeps him out and speculates that he is hiding something. Theodore is having trouble with Nathan, a bully, and will not go to the principal, who plans to retire due to Alvin's daily mishaps, for help; Alvin sticks up for him, however.

Little Alvin and the Mini-Munks (2003)
La-Lu, a friend of David Seville, has put up a banner saying "Welcome Chipmunks" on the porch of her magic cottage. One of her friends, Gilda (a talking pessimistic  cockatoo) believes that having children around is a bad idea. PC (a talking laid back frog with a surfer dude accent who believes he is one kiss away from being Prince Charming) says that his mom used to say "nothing warms up a home like children's laughter". Dave arrives with Alvin, Brittany, Simon, Jeanette, Theodore, and Eleanor. Dave needs the weekend to himself to write a new song, and La-Lu is happy to have five pre-schoolers and a baby stay with her and her friends. Sam and Lou, two gophers, report to the viewers at home about the feelings the characters are experiencing via going into their heads and viewing an abstract inner visual manifestation of what the characters are thinking and or feeling. Alvin doesn't like that Dave is gone, and La-Lu explains that she felt the same way when she was little and reassures him that Dave will return for him and the others soon.

Reception

Box office performance

The live action animated films are the highest-grossing live-action/animated film series and 6th highest-grossing musicals film series of all time. The first film ranks as the 7th highest grossing live-action/animated film of all time, with its sequels being ranked 4th, 11th, and 21st of all time.

Critical and public response

Cast and crew

Cast
List indicator
A dark gray cell indicates the character was not featured in the film.

An  indicates a performer stood in as a characters singing voice.

Crew

Notes

References

External links

20th Century Studios franchises
English-language films
Films about families
Films produced by Karen Rosenfelt
Comedy film series
Children's film series